Silvia Persico (born 25 July 1997) is an Italian professional racing cyclist, who currently rides for UCI Women's WorldTeam .

Major results

Cyclo-cross

2016–2017
 2nd National Under-23 Championships
 3rd Vittorio Veneto
2017–2018
 3rd National Under-23 Championships
 3rd Vittorio Veneto
 3rd Gorizia
2018–2019
 2nd National Under-23 Championships
 3rd Vittorio Veneto
2019–2020
 3rd Jesolo
2021–2022
 1st  National Championships
 1st Cremona
 2nd Fae' Di Oderzo
 3rd  UCI World Championships
 3rd Jesolo
2022–2023
 1st  National Championships
 Swiss Cup
1st Meilen
 1st San Colombano Certenoli
 1st Vittorio Veneto
 1st Fae' Di Oderzo
 1st Jesolo

Road

2016
 6th Gran Premio della Liberazione
2017
 5th Gran Premio della Liberazione
 7th Diamond Tour
 8th Erondegemse Pijl
2018
 5th Road race, National Championships
 7th Diamond Tour
2019
 4th Vuelta a la Comunitat Valenciana
2021
 9th Vuelta a la Comunitat Valenciana
2022
 1st Gran Premio della Liberazione
 3rd Overall Grand Prix Elsy Jacobs
 3rd  Road race, UCI World Championships
 5th Overall Tour de France
 7th Brabantse Pijl
 8th Trofeo Alfredo Binda
 9th Gent–Wevelgem
 10th Strade Bianche
2023
 3rd Overall UAE Tour
 6th Trofeo Alfredo Binda

References

External links

1997 births
Living people
Italian female cyclists
Cyclo-cross cyclists
People from Alzano Lombardo
Cyclists from the Province of Bergamo